Bhimesvara Bisrama ghara is located in the Bhimesvara temple precinct in the Kapila Prasad, Housing Board Colony, Bhimatangi, Bhubaneswar. It is facing towards north. It has pyramidal superstructure.

Traditions & legends
Locals legend associates the precinct with the Pandava brothers.

Ownership
Single/ Multiple: Multiple
Public/ Private: Private
Bhimesvara Mandira Parichalana Samiti

Age
Approximate date: 18th–19th Century A.D.
Source of Information: Architectural features and building materials

Property Type
Precinct/ Building/ Structure/Landscape/Site/Tank: Precinct
Subtype: Temple
Typology: pidha deul

Property use
Abandoned/ in use: In use.

Significance
Cultural significance: Sivaratri, Kartika Purnima, Dola Purnima are performed.

Physical description
Surrounding: The Rest house is surrounded by another rest house in west at a distance of 1.35 metres, compound wall on east at
a distance of 4.00 metres, Arjunesvara temple on north within a distance of 1.85 metres and a modern structure in south at a distance
of 1.50 metres.

Orientation: The Rest house is facing towards north.

Architectural features (Plan & Elevation)
On plan, the structure has a square vimana measuring 4.00 square metres, with a frontal porch measuring 2.00 metres in length. On elevation, the vimana is in pidha order that measures 5.03 metres in height from pabhaga to mastaka. From bottom to the top the
temple has a bada, gandi and mastaka. With fivefold divisions of the bada the temple has a panchanga bada measuring 2.53 metres in height. Pabhaga measures 0.49 metres, tala jangha 0.62 metres, bandhana 0.23 metres, upara jangha 0.61 metres 42 and baranda 0.59 metres. The gandi measures 2.00 metres and mastaka 0.50 metres.

Decorative features
Door Jambs: There are two door ways leading into the sanctum
Lintel: Lintel is plain
Building material: Laterite
Construction techniques: Ashlar masonry with lime and cement mortar.
Style: Kalingan

State of preservation
Good/Fair/ Showing Signs of Deterioration/Advanced: Good

Grade (A/B/C)
Architecture: C
Historic: C
Associational: C
Social/Cultural: C

Reference and notes

K.C. Panigrahi, Archaeological Remains at Bhubaneswar, Calcutta, 1961. P. 174.
L. S.S. O’ Malley, Bengal District Gazetter Puri, Calcutta 1908, P. 241.
M.M. Ganguly, Orissa and Her Remains, Calcutta, 1912, P. 274.
R.L. Mitra. The Antiquities of Orissa, Calcutta, 1963, P. 162.

External links
 http://www.ignca.nic.in/asi_reports/orkhurda350.pdf
 http://www.hvacraleigh.net/press/Gandi.html
 https://web.archive.org/web/20101226024119/http://ignca.nic.in/asi_reports/orkhurda131.pdf
 http://dubaipropertyforsale.net/tourism/press/Vimana.html
 http://appleiphonesystems.com/news/Kanika.html
 https://web.archive.org/web/20120402191159/http://bioprintindustries.org/news/Baranda.html
 https://web.archive.org/web/20120402084051/http://www.berryindo.com/news/news/Ratha.html
 http://www.mediapartners.tv/news/Door-jamb.html
 http://drugeducationtoday.com/press/Bhaga.html
 https://web.archive.org/web/20120402191143/http://shedandgarageplans.org/forums/Dvarapala.html
 http://reviewsvlog.com/videos/Precinct.html
 http://free-web-traffic.knowledgespider.com/news/Paga.html
 https://web.archive.org/web/20120402191143/http://www.baillyhosting.com/news/wireless/news/Plain-Old-Documentation.html

Buildings and structures in Odisha